The Finnish Standards Association (SFS) is the central standards organization in Finland. It is a member organization of the ISO and CEN, representing Finland in these organizations. SFS is responsible for both international and national standards, with the former being translated from ISO standards. The organization acts as a central organization for 13 different national standards writing bodies, such as SESKO and FICORA.

References

External links
Official website

ISO member bodies
Organizations established in 1924
1924 establishments in Finland
Standards organisations in Finland